Emi Koyama (b. 1975) is a Japanese-American activist, artist, and independent scholar. Koyama's work discusses issues of feminism, intersex human rights, domestic violence, and sex work among many others. Koyama is best known for her 2000 essay "The Transfeminist Manifesto", which has been republished in many anthologies and journals for transgender studies. She is a founder of the advocacy group Intersex Initiative.

Activism 

In 2001, Koyama served as a student intern and program assistant for the Intersex Society of North America, before leaving to found her own advocacy group, Intersex Initiative Portland (ipdx). The organization features classes, workshops, and speakers to discuss social, cultural, and medical issues faced by intersex people. Koyama and fellow intersex activist Betsy Driver also helped found Intersex Awareness Day in 2003, commemorating the first official demonstration by intersex activists in North America.

Koyama is an advocate for third-wave feminism and transfeminism, with her 2000 publication "The Transfeminist Manifesto" being one of the earliest usages of the term. As defined by her, transfeminism is "a movement by and for trans women who view their liberation to be intrinsically linked to the liberation of all women and beyond." Alongside fellow Survivor Project member Diana Courvant, Koyama founded the website Transfeminism.org. The now defunct website was created originally to promote the Transfeminism Anthology Project, which aimed to create the first anthology centered around intersex and trans feminist perspectives; the website also served as a general resource surrounding discussion of transfeminism in academia and activism.

Koyama is an advocate for the decriminalization of sex work, and is currently a member of the Coalition for Rights and Safety for People in the Sex Trade located in Seattle. Koyama was previously also a board member of the Survival Project, a now-defunct organization serving intersex and transgender survivors of sexual abuse and domestic violence.

In 2001, Koyama helped form the Third Wave Feminisms Interest Group at the National Women’s Studies Association (NWSA); the group aimed to "push forward the discussion about third wave feminisms by moving the focus away from generational politics or identity group and onto epistemological and ontological shifts made possible through adopting the label, 'third wave. While Koyama has been a regular participant and speaker in NWSA conferences, she has also been notably critical of the organization. In 2008, she published a blog post titled "This is Not a Tribute to Audre Lorde", criticizing the conference's treatment of her and other women of color.

In 2013, Koyama also spoke out against the Forging Justice conference, sponsored by the National Organization for Men against Sexism (NOMAS) and the Michigan domestic violence organization HAVEN. Conference presenters allegedly refused to live stream her panel on intersectional feminism, and had threatened to interrupt it entirely. Koyama's writings on sex trafficking were also reportedly criticized by NOMAS co-founder Robert Brannon; she described Brannon as "violating her boundaries" during later interactions at the conference. Koyama, along with other female presenters at the conference, created a list of demands to NOMAS advocating for reform of the organization’s internal policies to prevent the silencing and mistreatment of female activists.

Since 2000, Koyama has spoken out against the infamous "womyn-born womyn" policy at the Michigan Womyn’s Music Festival. Her article "Whose Feminism is It Anyways? The Unspoken Racism of the Trans Inclusion Debate" criticized the festival's organizers for a policy that "essentializes, polarizes, and dichotomizes genders." Koyama also participated in a 2002 roundtable published in Bitch magazine focused on the festival, writing "women-only spaces are not as safe or free… but are rife with the same old racism, classism, ableism, and even internalized sexism acted on by women against other women." Koyama advocated instead for an ambiguous "women-only" policy that does not institute or enforce a specific definition of women. Koyama's blog Eminism features an archive that summarizes the debate and compiles historical documents related to the festival.

Personal life 
Koyama resides in Portland, Oregon, with her two dogs. She continues to write about social justice issues on her blog and personal website, Eminism. She also runs an online store, where she sells buttons, zines, and apparel designed by herself and other activists.

In a 2014 interview with Source Weekly, Koyama describes herself as being a "runaway teen" and having engaged in sex work as an adult.

Koyama uses the pronouns she and her, but does not identify with any particular gender, stating on her blog that "she thinks that having an identity—especially gender identity—is kind of weird: how she views herself depends on the human relationships and interactions that surround her, rather than arising from some intrinsic core sense of self."

Koyama is bilingual, and publishes articles in both English and Japanese.

Selected bibliography 

 "Whose feminism is it anyway? The unspoken racism of the trans inclusion debate," in The Transgender Studies Reader, ed. Susan Stryker. New York: Routledge, 2006. 
 "Disloyal to feminism: Abuse of survivors within the domestic violence shelter system." In The Color of Violence: INCITE! Anthology, ed.
 "A new fat-positive feminism: Why the old fat-positive feminism (often) sucks and how to re-invent it." in The Women's Movement Today: An Encyclopedia of Third-Wave Feminism, ed. Heywood L. Westport, Conn.: Greenwood Press, 2005. .
 "Douseikon wo meguru beikoku LGBT komyunitii no poritikusu." ("The politics over same-sex marriages within LGBT communities.") in Dousei paatonaa: Douseikon DP-hou wo shiru tameni.  (Same-sex partnerships: Understanding same-sex marriage and domestic partnership registry.) Eds. Akasugi Y, Tsuchiya Y, Tsutsui M, 2004. [in Japanese] 
 "The transfeminist manifesto." In Catching a Wave: Reclaiming Feminism for the 21st Century. Eds. Dicker R, Piepmeier A. Boston: Northeastern University Press, 2003. . 
 "From social construction to social justice: Transforming how we teach about intersexuality." Co-authored with Lisa Weasel, in Women's Studies Quarterly Vol. 30, No. 3/4, Fall/Winter 2002.

References 

Japanese-American civil rights activists

1975 births
Living people
Intersex women
Intersex rights activists

Feminist writers
Transfeminists
American feminists
Sex worker activists